Danielle (Dani) Couture (born 1978) is a Canadian poet and novelist.

In 2011, Couture's second book of poetry, Sweet, was shortlisted for the Trillium Book Award for Poetry in English and won the ReLit Award for Poetry. In 2011, she also received an Honour of Distinction from the Writers' Trust of Canada's Dayne Ogilvie Prize.

She is also the literary editor at This Magazine.

Biography
Couture was born on a military base to a francophone father and an anglophone mother, both of whom were enlisted in the Canadian Forces. She has lived in ten cities, including North Bay, Vancouver, Windsor and Taichung, Taiwan. She currently lives in Toronto, Ontario.

Couture's poetry, essays, reviews and interviews have been published in various literary journals and magazines and anthologies, including The Walrus, The Globe and Mail, Taddle Creek, The Fiddlehead, Arc and Best Canadian Poems in English.

Selected works

Poetry
Good Meat. Toronto: Pedlar Press, 2006.
Sweet. Toronto: Pedlar Press, 2010.
YAW. Toronto: Mansfield, 2014.
Listen Before Transmit. Toronto: Wolsak & Wynn, 2018.

Chapbooks
Black Sea Nettle. Toronto: Anstruther, 2017.

Novels
Algoma. Invisible Publishing, 2011

Awards and recognition
2011 Relit Award for Poetry 
2011 Shortlisted for Trillium Book Award for Poetry
2011 Honour of Distinction Dayne Ogilvie Prize

See also

Canadian literature
Canadian poetry
List of Canadian poets
List of Canadian writers

References

External links

Dani Couture at TLA
Interview with Dani Couture by The Poetry Extension

1978 births
Living people
Canadian women poets
Canadian women novelists
Writers from Toronto
University of Windsor alumni
21st-century Canadian poets
21st-century Canadian novelists
Canadian LGBT poets
Canadian LGBT novelists
21st-century Canadian women writers
21st-century Canadian LGBT people